Verruculogen is a mycotoxin produced by certain strains of aspergillus that belongs to a class of naturally occurring 2,5-diketopiperazines.  It is an annulated analogue of cyclo(L-Trp-L-Pro) which belongs to the most abundant and structurally diverse class of tryptophan-proline 2,5-diketopiperazine natural products.  It produces tremors in mice due to its neurotoxic properties. It also tested positive in a Salmonella/mammalian microsome assay and was shown to be genotoxic. It is a potent blocker of calcium-activated potassium channels.

Synthesis
Both verruculogen and its isoprenyl derivative fumitremorgin A belong to the only family of alkaloids with an eight-membered endoperoxide ring, and both have been synthesised involving ligand-controlled C–H borylation.

References

Mycotoxins
Diketopiperazines
Organic peroxides
Indole alkaloids